The East Prussian Regional Museum in Lüneburg, Lower Saxony in Germany, was established 1987 on the basis of the East Prussian Hunting Museum created by forester Hans Loeffke. It documents and commemorates the history, art and culture, but also the landscape and fauna of the former German province of East Prussia. Since spring 2009 the director of the museum is historian Dr. Joachim Mähnert.

References

External links 

 

Lüneburg
Museums in Lower Saxony
Museum
Ethnic cleansing of Germans
Museums established in 1987
1987 establishments in West Germany